"Burning in the Skies" is a song by American rock band Linkin Park. It was announced as the band's third single from their fourth studio album, A Thousand Suns, on January 20, 2011, and it was released on March 21.
A music video for the single was directed by Joe Hahn, Linkin Park's turntablist.  It was released in the United States to the Nielsen BDS adult contemporary indicator chart by February 2011, although it was clarified by vocalist Mike Shinoda that it is an international-only single, hence not charting in any Billboard charts.

"Burning in the Skies" (along with five other songs from A Thousand Suns) is featured in the "Linkin Park Track Pack" as downloadable content for the rhythm video game Guitar Hero: Warriors of Rock. The track pack was released on October 19, 2010.

Music video

Filming for the music video occurred from January 17 through 19, 2011, with Joe Hahn and lead vocalist Mike Shinoda tweeting about filming the video.

The international music video was directed by Joe Hahn. The video premiered on kerrang.com on February 22. The video was also uploaded on YouTube by Linkin Park on their official YouTube channel linkinparktv. The entire video is in slow motion. It shows the final activities of random people (a teen party; a couple in a car; a girl in her bathroom; another girl studying with her computer; an old man dining alone; and a kid running with pajamas and a lion mask) before being caught in a blast radius of what seems to be a nuclear explosion in downtown Los Angeles. The explosion happens when the guitar solo starts. Then the band members are seen in darkness with effects similar to the ones used in the "Waiting for the End" music video, although they do not sing or perform their instruments in accordance to the song.

As of October 2022, the music video for "Burning in the Skies" has over 55 million views on YouTube.

The behind-the-scenes video for "Burning in the Skies" was released on March 29, 2011.

Live performances
The song made its debut full live performance at their Melbourne, Australia show on December 13, 2010 during their A Thousand Suns World Tour as the chorus had been sung by Mike Shinoda and Chester Bennington after the bridge of "Bleed It Out" in several shows of the tour.

Reception
Jean Dean Wells of AOL Radio praised the song, saying that the band "delivered an upbeat track that could play just as easily on any pop radio station."

Track listing

Personnel
 Chester Bennington – vocals
 Mike Shinoda – lead vocals, sampler, lead guitar, piano, keyboard
 Brad Delson – rhythm guitar
 Dave "Phoenix" Farrell – bass guitar, backing vocals
 Joe Hahn – turntables, samplers
 Rob Bourdon – drums, percussion

Commercial performance
Since Shinoda confirmed that it is an international-only single, the single did not chart on any Billboard charts aside from debuting on the Rock Digital Song Sales chart for a solitary week at 37 solely on the strength of digital downloads of the song following the release of A Thousand Suns. The single received moderate success on the charts where it charted. It peaked within the Top 40 on the Austrian, German Airplay, and Portuguese charts, while it was a Top 20 hit on the UK Rock & Metal Chart peaking at number 16 and staying on the UK Rock & Metal charts for two weeks.

Charts

References

Linkin Park songs
2010 songs
2011 singles
Anti-war songs
Protest songs
Songs written by Mike Shinoda
Rock ballads
Warner Records singles
Song recordings produced by Rick Rubin
Electronic rock songs